GMX Multi Messenger was an instant messenger software and application launched by the German webmail provider GMX Mail in November 2006.  GMX is a subsidiary of United Internet, a company that also owns the webmailer Web.de, which offered the same instant messenger client with their own branding.

Features

Other instant messaging providers such as AIM, Live Messenger, ICQ and Yahoo can be integrated with this software
Messaging with emoticon capability
Various skins
Integration with social networking sites such as MySpace and StudiVZ.

External links
GMX Messenger
Web.de Messenger

Instant messaging